Le Roi du Ziglibithy is one of Ivoirian singer Ernesto Djédjé's best known albums. It was released in 1977.

Track listing
 "Zadié Bobo" – 4:09 
 "Ziglibithiens" – 8:49 
 "Béhido" – 3:16
 "Lola" – 4:41
 "Gnizako" – 6:49 
 "Assouna" – 6:35 
 "Ziboté" – 5:50
 "Loué Digben" – 3:43 
 "Azonadê" – 7:57
 "Oyéno" – 5:29
 "Dogbohoné" – 6:53

1977 albums